Show! Music Core, or simply Music Core is a South Korean music television program broadcast by MBC. It airs live every Saturday at 15:30 (KST). The show features some of the latest and most popular artists who perform live on stage. It is broadcast from MBC Dream Center in Goyang, Gyeonggi.

History 
Prior to the current Show! Music Core, numerous music programs with similar content were aired on MBC. Below is the list in chronological order.

Live Music Camp was cancelled due to a broadcast accident of revealing genitalia.

After a brief hiatus, Show! Music Core began airing on October 29, 2005, with charts similar to its predecessors. However, the charts were removed on January 7, 2006, and it continues to air without any charts or awards. Even without the weekly chart award, the show was known for its special production and stages.

From 2007 to 2008, a "Mobile Ranking" segment was used to rank the popularity of songs downloaded to mobile phones and from online music sites.

On March 11, 2013, MBC announced that they would return their chart system after seven years without the segment. The ranking system was reinstalled on April 20, 2013, with a first-place trophy given to the top song amongst the nominees for each week.

November 21, 2015, MBC announced that their chart system would be removed once again. The MBC variety department said: "Instead of the ranking system, we intend to show more diverse genres of music and continue to work hard to be a representative music program of Korea.”

On February 11, 2016, MBC announced a trial phase of their simultaneous live broadcast of Show! Music Core in HD and UHD (ultra-high-definition) utilizing a dedicated 4K camera, in preparation for their launch of UHD broadcasts scheduled for 2017. The trial phase had taken place February 13 through March 12, 2016.

On April 5, 2017, MBC announced that they would, yet again, return to their chart ranking system since April 22, 2017.

Presenters

Chart system 
Music Core brought back the show's chart on April 20, 2013. First-place winners are determined using the ranking system below. The list also shows the current and former scoring computation used. As of June 8, 2013, four nominees had decreased to three nominees. This chart is called M-chart, and tracking from Monday to Monday of the following week.

Asterisk (*) indicates the criteria that are for first-place nominees only.

Based source and explanations for each criterion, in alphabetical order: 
 Broadcast: MBC radio (April 22, 2017 - now) + TV (February 27, 2021 - now).
 Digital sales: Numbers of download, streaming based on Gaon digital chart. During the time that Vibe and FLO sponsor Music Core, this also include Vibe and FLO respectively as a separate criterion and that criterion is for first-place nominees only
 Live-vote: Voting during the show. Currently via text message + Mubeat app (June 5, 2021 - now). Always for 1st place nominees only.
 Physical sales: Number of copies, based on Gaon album chart
 Pre-vote: Mubeat app. Before February 27, 2021; this criterion is only for 1st place nominees only. This is held from Tuesday to Thursday (mean 4 days prior to 2 days prior; before February 27, 2021 is Tuesday to Friday, which mean 4 days prior to a day prior).
 Video views or SNS: YouTube views, only count from official MV.
 Viewer committee: A survey via official Music Core website, 2000 MBC accounts will be randomly chosen to be part of viewer committee voting. This is held from Wednesday to Thursday.

The Top 50 songs of the week are featured on the show, where the Top 30–11 songs are shown via two marquee (one is for 30-21 and another is for 20-11) in the last of two different stages and the Top 10–4 songs are featured by the hosts. The hosts then showcase the Top three songs and announce who will be the winner of the week. The Number 1 song on the chart is the winner of that week's chart and receives an award. Every songs that have been released no more than two months and not got quintuple crown (i. e: 5 wins in this show) yet are eligible on chart. However, OST, songs released through audition program and deemed unsuitable (at MBC's discretion) is not eligible. For top 50 songs of the week (full chart), it will be posted on music show's official website every Monday/Tuesday/Wednesday of the following week.

From May 20, 2017, to February 20, 2021, the rule was every song that is not released no more than three months is eligible. Before May 20, 2017; every songs, regardless of when it release or number of time get the first place, are eligible.

List of winners

2005

2013

2014

2015

(Starting from November 14, 2015, the ranking system was abolished but was revived later on April 22, 2017)

2017

2018

2019 – present

Achievements by artists

Quintuple Crown 
Starting from February 27, 2021, Show! Music Core implemented the Quintuple Crown, which is a song that has received first place five times consecutively. After that, the song is removed from the chart and ineligible to win again.

Controversy 

On 20 April 2013, MBC introduced a brand new ranking system for Show! Music Core, and as such had nominated INFINITE, K.Will, Davichi, and Lee Hi for the first place award. Singer K.Will was mistakenly announced as the winner. He looked confused, and was about to say thanks when the Show! Music Core staff quickly informed everyone on stage that there had been a mistake and that INFINITE was the actual winner. K.Will laughed it off and said: "It's okay, I’m okay." He shouted, "I love INFINITE!" The INFINITE members looked unsure about accepting the trophy.

Afterwards, the staff of the show was highly criticized by viewers. The staff made a statement on their official board and said,
{{Blockquote
|text=This is the ‘Show! Music Core’ staff. There was a mistake in announcing the 1st-place winner on the 20 April broadcast. This was a mistake because the text votes were mixed up for the two 1st place nominees. The two team's scores are 100% fair results. The text votes accumulation company has promised to work harder to keep this from happening again. Please excuse us for not running a smooth live broadcast. Thank you.<ref>{{Cite news|url=http://news.nate.com/view/20130420n09388|script-title=ko:음악중심' 치명적 방송사고, 1위가 바뀌었다'|date=20 April 2013|publisher=NATE|access-date=20 April 2013|language=ko}}</ref>
}}

 Notes 

 Similar programs 
 SBS Inkigayo KBS Music Bank Mnet M Countdown Arirang TV Simply K-Pop (formerly called The M-Wave and Wave K)
 JTBC Music Universe K-909 MBC M Show Champion SBS M The Show''

See also 
 Music programs of South Korea
 MBC Gayo Daejejeon

References

External links 
  

2010s South Korean television series
2005 South Korean television series debuts
MBC TV original programming
South Korean music television shows
Korean-language television shows
South Korean music chart television shows